Cin Khan Pau (also spelled Cin Kham Pau; born 19 August 1955) is a Burmese politician currently serving as a House of Nationalities MP for Chin State No. 6 constituency. In 1980, he graduated from Mandalay University and in 1984, graduated from Yangon Institute of Education.

Early life and education 
Cin Khan Pau was born in Phunom Village, Tedim Township, Chin State on 19 August 1955. He graduated B.Sc and B.Ed degrees and served as a deputy director of Ministry of Education.

Political career
He is a member of the Union Solidarity and Development Party, he was elected representative from Chin State No. 6 parliamentary constituency.

References

Union Solidarity and Development Party politicians
1955 births
Living people
People from Chin State
Government ministers of Myanmar
Members of the House of Nationalities
Mandalay University alumni